Podlesie  is a settlement in the administrative district of Gmina Kamienica Polska, within Częstochowa County, Silesian Voivodeship, in southern Poland.

The settlement has a population of 19.

References

Podlesie